Kang Min-Hyuk (born 10 July 1982) is a South Korean football defender who currently plays for Gyeongnam FC in the K-League. His previous clubs are Seongnam Ilhwa, Gyeongnam FC, Gwangju Sangmu and Jeju United.

On 25 October 2009, Kang Min-Hyuk made his professional career total 100 appearances in a 0–0 draw away against Chunnam Dragons.

Career statistics

External links 

1982 births
Living people
Association football defenders
South Korean footballers
Seongnam FC players
Gyeongnam FC players
Jeju United FC players
Gimcheon Sangmu FC players
K League 1 players
Sportspeople from Jeju Province